Innocent Mdledle (born 11 December 1985 in Matatiele, Eastern Cape) is a South African retired footballer. in the Premier Soccer League and for the South Africa national soccer team. On 26 September 2007, Mdledle was added to the South Africa squad competing in the 2007 COSAFA Cup, even though he was just returning from a calf injury.

Before debuting for the national team, Mdledle was a standout player on the South African under-23 squad, known as Amaglug-glug. He was also part of the South African team at the 2009 FIFA Confederations Cup. He formerly played for Witbank Spurs, Orlando Pirates, and Mamelodi Sundowns.

References

External links

Player profile

1985 births
Living people
South African soccer players
South African Premier Division players
South Africa international soccer players
2009 FIFA Confederations Cup players
Association football defenders
Orlando Pirates F.C. players
Mamelodi Sundowns F.C. players
SuperSport United F.C. players
Mpumalanga Black Aces F.C. players